The Qatar Grand Prix is a Formula One motor racing event which is held in Qatar. It was held for the first time on 21 November as part of the  championship at the Lusail International Circuit, and after not taking place during the  season due to the 2022 FIFA World Cup taking place in Qatar, it will rejoin the calendar in  under a 10-year contract. The race was established as the fourth full night race on the Formula One calendar, following the Singapore, Bahrain and Sakhir Grands Prix.

History

Origin 

The  Formula One season was initially planned over 23 races. The opening round of the season, the Australian Grand Prix, was initially postponed due to COVID-19 restrictions in the country before being cancelled.

The cancellation of the Australian Grand Prix occurred late during the season and left a vacancy in the calendar, and the inaugural Qatar Grand Prix was announced as its replacement in October 2021.

2021 

The inaugural edition of the Qatar Grand Prix took place on 21 November, in place of the cancelled Australian Grand Prix.

2023 

A new purpose-built circuit was initially proposed for the 2023 race, before being retained in Lusail.

Sportswashing criticism 

The Grand Prix has received criticism from Amnesty International on the grounds of human rights in Qatar.

Winners

By year
The Qatar Grand Prix was held at the Lusail International Circuit.

References 

 
Formula One Grands Prix
2021 establishments in Qatar
Formula One controversies
Recurring sporting events established in 2021